Coelogyne cumingii is a species of orchid. It is named after Hugh Cuming, the 19th century collector.

cumingii
Plants described in 1821